The SAT 1 Supercup '89 was the fourth and final season of the Supercup, a West German auto racing series organized by the ADAC and sponsored by SAT 1 television.  Held over five events in West Germany and Great Britain, the driver's championship was won by Frenchmen Bob Wollek; his team Joest Racing won the team's championship.  The series was canceled following the 1989 season, ending a yearly series of German sports car championships dating back to 1972.

Entries

C1

C2

Schedule and results
The series ventured outside West Germany for the first time, replacing the traditional Hockenheimring event with a race at the Silverstone Circuit in Great Britain.  The Silverstone round allowed many competitors from the BRDC Sportscar Championship to compete alongside the Supercup.  The other four events of the series remained in their calendar positions.

Supercup